Leeds East or East Leeds may refer to several things associated with the eastern part of Leeds, a city in England:

 Leeds East (UK Parliament constituency)
 Leeds East Airport
 Leeds East Academy, a school
 East Leeds A.R.L.F.C., a rugby club
 East Leeds Parkway railway station, a name for a proposed railway station
 East Leeds FM, a radio station